Tralee Mitchels were a Gaelic Athletic Association club in Tralee, County Kerry, Ireland before the formation of the three Tralee clubs namely John Mitchels, Austin Stacks and Kerins O'Rahilly's. They were one of the top teams in the county winning Football County Championships in 1896, 1897, 1902, 1903, 1907, 1908, 1910, 1917 and 1919. They also won three Hurling County Championship in 1908, 1911, 1912

The first recorded meeting of Tralee Mitchels club officers was on 29 January 1888 at the Young Ireland Society Rooms.

Roll Of Honour
 Kerry Senior Football Championship Winners (9) 1896, 1897, 1902, 1903, 1907, 1908, 1910, 1917, 1919
 Kerry Senior Hurling Championship Winners (3) 1908, 1911, 1912
 Munster Senior Football Championship Winners (3) 1903, 1904, 1905
 All-Ireland Senior Football Championship Winners (2) 1903, 1904

County Championship winning captains

Football
 1896:
 1897: James O'Connell 
 1902: Edward Hannafin 
 1903: Thady O'Gorman 
 1907: Maurice McCarthy
 1908: Tom Costello 
 1910: Con Healy 
 1917: Jack McGaley 
 1919: Martin Carroll

Hurling
 1908: Dan Mullins
 1911: Paddy O'Mahoney
 1912: Tom Costello

References

Former Gaelic Athletic Association clubs in Kerry
Gaelic games clubs in County Kerry
Gaelic football clubs in County Kerry
Hurling clubs in County Kerry
Mitchells